Agrarian Party of Ukraine is a political party in Ukraine that was revived in October 2006 and was legally registered as a party in 2006.

History
Initially Agrarian Party of Ukraine was created and registered in 1996, but soon after electing Volodymyr Lytvyn the party was renamed couple of times and now is known as the People's Party.

In 2006 the "Agrarian Party" was resuscitated by registering anew. The party was headed by Bloc Yulia Tymoshenko MP's Mikhail Zubets and Mikhail Gladius. In August 2006 they became part of the parliamentary coalition supporting the Second Yanukovych government.

Between 2010 and 2014 the party is chaired alternately by members of the First and Second Azarov government: Deputy Prime Minister for Agricultural Policy Viktor Slauta and Deputy Minister of Agrarian Ivan Bysyuk.

In the 2010 Ukrainian local elections, the party gains 15th place in Ukraine: 410 members are elected into local councils.

In 2014 Vitaliy Skotsyk became chairman of the party.

In 2015 the revived Agrarian Party was among the most active during local elections and placed fifth among all parties nationwide by number of representatives.

From March 2016 until January 2018 veteran politician Roman Bezsmertnyi was one of the party leaders of the Agrarian Party of Ukraine.

According to the Agrarian Party party leader Skotsyk was expelled from the party on 12 September 2018 for "actions that harm the authority and discredit the governing body of the party and the party as a whole".

On 3 January 2019 Skotsyk did file documents with the Central Election Commission for registration as a candidate for the 2019 Ukrainian presidential election; claiming to do so as a candidate of the Agrarian Party. The following day the party denied this because they had expelled him. The Central Election Commission registered Skotsyk as a candidate on 8 January, he was registered as a self-nominated candidate.

In the 2019 Ukrainian parliamentary election the party gained 0.51% of the national vote and no parliamentary seats, the party also failed to win a constituency seat.

In the 2020 Ukrainian local elections the party gained 44 deputies (0.66% of all available mandates in places with less than 10,000 people).

References

External links
 Official website

See also
Agrarian Party of Russia
Belarusian Agrarian Party

Political parties established in 2006
2006 establishments in Ukraine
Agrarian parties in Ukraine
Conservative parties in Ukraine